Pentalina may refer to:

MV Pentalina
MV Pentalina-B
Pentland Ferries